William Benjamin Scandrett (7 February 1840 – 23 September 1917) was an English-born New Zealand politician. He immigrated to New Zealand in 1855 and came to Invercargill in 1862. He was the first town clerk of Invercargill after it was proclaimed a municipality, serving from 1871 to 1893. He was deputy mayor of Invercargill twice (1902 and 1911) and mayor of Invercargill three times (1894–1895, 1904–1909 and 1912–1913). Scandrett married Susannah Hinton Milstead and had five children.

See also
1894 Invercargill mayoral election
1912 Invercargill mayoral election

References

Sources

External links
Southland and its Resources: Being a Paper on the Resources of the District of Southland, Otago, New Zealand ... Read at a Meeting of the Southland Institute, Invercargill, on 18 September 1883; Together With Comments by Members in The Pamphlet Collection of Sir Robert Stout: Volume 22
Brief History of Eastern Cemetery – past mayors

1840 births
1917 deaths
People from Clapham
English emigrants to New Zealand
Invercargill City Councillors
Deputy mayors of Invercargill
Mayors of Invercargill
Burials at Eastern Cemetery, Invercargill